Ron Pocock (13 June 1928 – 15 January 2012) was a harness racing horse breeder and trainer, who also played Australian rules football with Footscray in the Victorian Football League (VFL).

Notes

External links 		
		
		

		
		
1928 births		
2012 deaths	
Australian horse trainers
Australian racehorse owners and breeders
Australian rules footballers from Victoria (Australia)		
Western Bulldogs players